Abu Muhammad Salih ibn Yansaran Said ibn Ghafiyyan ibn al-Haj Yahya al-Dukkali al-Majiri (sometimes spelled al-Magiri), simply known as Abu Muhammad Salih (1155–1234), was a Moroccan saint and one of the successors of Abu Madyan. He was the patron saint of Safi and lived during the reign of the Almohad Caliphate.

Biography 
Salih was born in 1155 in the town of Asfi (Safi). His family were a Berber family that settled in Asfi in the mid 11th century. They belonged to the Banu Hayy, a sub-clan of the Banu Nasr, a clan of the Banu Magir, a Southern Masmuda Berber tribe. He studied under Abu Abdallah Mohammed Amghar in Ribat Shakir. In , he returned to Morocco and founded a ribat in Safi. The Sufi brotherhood of the Magiriyyun derives from him. He wrote a Talqin al-wird and the ribat in Safi, where Abou Mohammed was buried, continued to play an important role until the end of the 15th century. There remains but one written work by Al-Maghri, Bidayat al Mourid, a book on Tassawuf and the lives of certain Sufi saints like Al-Maghri's teacher Abu Madyan. This book would later form the basis of the beliefs of Abdelaziz al-Tebaa. The life of Al-Magiri is described in Al-Minhaj al-wadih, written by Ahmad ibn Ibrahim al-Magiri, a grandson of the saint.

References

Bibliography
Y. Benhima: "L’évolution du peuplement et l’organisation du territoire de la région de Safi à l’époque almohade", in: Los Almohades, Problemas y Perspectivas
Abu Muhammad Silih, Al-Manaqib wa-l-ta'rikh, Rabat, 1990

External links
Dar-sirr.com Sidi Abu Mohammed al-Majiri (d. 631/1216) (retrieved on September 9, 2008)

1155 births
1234 deaths
12th-century Berber people
13th-century Berber people
12th-century Moroccan writers
13th-century Moroccan writers
Berber Muslims
Berber writers
Moroccan Sufi saints
Moroccan Sufi writers
People from Safi, Morocco